Sister Dora Nginza, known as the “Mother of New Brighton" (17 October 1891 – 1955), was one of the earliest and most influential pioneers of public health service for black people in New Brighton, Port Elizabeth, Eastern Cape.

Biography
Sister Dora Nginza, born Dora Jacob, was born on the Baviaanspoort farm near Cradock to Mr and Mrs Hermanus Nyamezela Jacob, who because of racial segregation and economic exploitation, were illiterate. Her two brothers, Frank and John did, however, go on to become trained policemen regardless of the tumultuous time. When they realized that so-called Coloured policemen earned more money than their black counterparts, they edited their father’s surname Jacob to include an “s” and registered themselves as “Coloured” on the police salary sheets. Dora's father passed away when she was young so she received her early education using the edited surname "Jacobs". Dora Nginza received her early education in Cradock and later furthered it in Port Elizabeth. She went on to train as a nurse at the Victoria Hospital, Lovedale in Alice, Eastern Cape during the World War I, being one of the first three African nurses to train under Niel Mac Vicar. She subsequently passed the qualifying SAMDC examination for registration as a nurse at the Port Elizabeth Provincial Hospital in 1919. On the 20th of January 1920, she qualified as a fully-fledged nurse.

In 1923, she married Chief Henry Nginza from the Gcaleka clan under AmaRharhabe. She and her husband Henry lived with their adopted children, son Velile and daughter Christine in New Brighton. When her husband died on 12 September 1943, a new headman had to be found. The Paramount Chief of the AmaRharhabe, Archibald Velile Sandile, bestowed the chieftainship of the Gcaleka clan on her. Until her death, she remained a representative of the Eastern Cape Urban Area conferring and deliberating with males on civic matters.

Sister Nginza retired from nursing in 1954 and died in June 1966 at Livingstone Hospital after a short illness at the age of 75. She was laid to rest next to her husband in New Brighton cemetery before her remains were moved and reburied next her husband Hernry on the grounds of the Dora Nginza Hospital in Zwide Township, Port Elizabeth.

Nursing
According to field research conducted by scholars on black health care workers in South Africa during the Apartheid regime, for many nurses, as for many doctors, the health care profession was one to which they felt intensely drawn. Some felt it was a religious calling while others believed it to be a more general call to heal the sick and to help those in distress. Upon the completion of her schooling and training, Sister Dora started working on 1 November 1919 and was the first district nurse to practice in New Brighton, outside Port Elizabeth, Eastern Cape. At the time of her appointment New Brighton had a high mortality rate and little medical attendance. She started working in a simple house that served as a makeshift hospital with only six stretchers, provided by the government. .  At first she operated and her excellent work in the development of healthcare in the township was commended by the Department of Native Affairs. Nginza was joined by two Lovedale-trained general nurses and the team paid visits to the population of 6000 in New Brighton as well as running a small hospital.  Not only did she perform nursing duties, Sister Nginza also served as the midwife, cook and cleaner. In 1923, she was transferred to the Port Elizabeth Health Department as a senior nursing sister. However, this did not stop Sister Nginza from dedicating her time to healthcare in New Brighton.

Sister Nginza retired in 1954 after 35 years of dedicated and devoted nursing service, leaving the New Brighton clinic with a staff of 25 registered nurses to provide community health services. Due to her commitment to the well-being of the community in New Brighton, she earned the title of "Mother of New Brighton".

Accolades
 Single-handedly, amid cultural scepticism, discrimination, poverty, ignorance about healthy healthcare practices and the devastating 1920 labour unrest, established a comprehensive health service in New Brighton, Port Elizabeth.
 Gained recognition as a key contributor to a major medical breakthrough in the diagnosis of typhus fever during the typhus fever epidemic. She taught the doctors themselves!
 In 1927, was delegated to Switzerland and England as the member of the Re-Armament Movement.
 Excelled as a role model nurse and leader in the Xhosa and broader community during her lifetime. This earned her the title of A! Nobantu (mother of the nation).
 Was bestowed the chieftainship in 1945 by the paramount chief of the AmaRharhabe after the death of her husband, headman, John Henry Nginza. She remained the representative of the Eastern Cape urban area until her death in 1966, a position that was exceptional for a woman at the time.
 In tribute to her years of good service, she was awarded a gold wristwatch by the New York-based Council for African Affairs in 1951, being the first African woman to receive an award that was annually allocated to people who did public work that benefited African people.
 In 1954, the Mayor of Port Elizabeth, Louis Dubb, presented her with a silver tray as a token of Port Elizabeth’s appreciation for Sister Nginza’s faithful service to the residents of New Brighton.

Legacy
Today, in the Zwide location, the Dora Nginza Hospital, named after the pioneer of medical healthcare for black people in Port Elizabeth, stands as a monument in recognition of her exceptional service to the black people in Port Elizabeth and its environment over a period of 35 years. It is situated in Spondo Street Zwide, ± 3 km from the Uitenhage Road. It has 570 active beds and offers Level 2 & Level 3 health care services to the community of Port Elizabeth and surrounding areas. In 2001, an Honorary Doctor’s degree was awarded posthumously to this great nursing pioneer by the University of Port Elizabeth now officially known as the Nelson Mandela University (NMU) since 18 July 2017. An NGO in honour of this pioneer, the Friends of Dora Nginza Society has since been established.

See also
 Dora Nginza Hospital
 Nelson Mandela Bay Municipality
 List of hospitals in South Africa

References

External links
 Nelson Mandela Bay Tourism
 South African Doctors
 Lahlekile: A Twentieth Century Chronicle of Nursing in South Africa

1891 births
1955 deaths
People from Chris Hani District Municipality
Cape Colony people
Xhosa people
South African nurses